The Sagar College of Science, also known as SCS Balasore is a private college which is affiliated to the Govt. of Odisha, Odisha, India. It is situated in the town of Balasore which sits between Kolkata, the capital of the state of West Bengal and Bhubaneswar, the capital of the state of Odisha. It consists of 1 academic departments with a strong emphasis on science education.

Established in the year 2006, it is one of the oldest private colleges of Odisha.

References 

Universities and colleges in Odisha
Education in Balasore district
Educational institutions established in 2006
2006 establishments in Orissa
Balasore